Hesperoperla hoguei, the banded stone, is a species of common stonefly in the family Perlidae. It is found in North America.

References

Perlidae
Articles created by Qbugbot
Insects described in 1980